Krzysztof Ratajski (born 1 January 1977) is a Polish professional darts player who plays in Professional Darts Corporation (PDC) events. His biggest achievement to date was winning the 2017 World Masters. Ratajski also plays on the Professional Darts Corporation's ProTour and has represented Poland at the PDC World Cup of Darts on numerous occasions. He is the most successful darts player to come from Poland.

Career

Ratajski's first major run came in the 2007 Czech Open where he reached the semi finals. He gained notable wins over Joey ten Berge and local player Marek Polak, eventually losing to Patrick Loos who won the tournament. He then went on to win the 2008 Denmark Open, a tournament previously won by the likes of John Lowe, Eric Bristow, Phil Taylor and Raymond van Barneveld. He defeated Hungary's Nándor Bezzeg, Finland's Marko Kantele and Belgian Geert De Vos en route to the final where he beat Fabian Roosenbrand.

On 4 December 2008 Ratajski qualified for the 2009 BDO World Darts Championship, earning one of five spots available. He earned notable wins over former qualifier Ian Jones and Mike Veitch before beating Robbie Green to qualify, becoming the first Polish player to qualify for either world championship. The next day, Ratajski took part in the 2008 Winmau World Masters, but lost in the very first round to Denmark's Stig Jorgensen. Ratajski then lost in the first round of the 2009 World Championship to Edwin Max.

Ratajski represented Poland in the inaugural PDC World Cup of darts in partnership with Krzysztof Kciuk. They lost 2–6 in the first round to New Zealand, who were represented by Phillip Hazel and Warren Parry. He did not feature in the tournament again until 2013, once more with Kciuk, and they progressed to the last 16 by finishing second in Group E thanks to beating Gibraltar 5–2. They played the host nation Germany, who were represented by Jyhan Artut and Andree Welge, and were defeated 5–2.

He lost in the semi-finals of the 2015 Polish Open 5–2 to Scott Waites. Ratajski made his European Tour debut at the 2015 European Darts Trophy and was edged out 6–5 by Adam Hunt in the first round. He was knocked out 3–2 by Martin Adams in the last 16 of the World Masters.

Ratajski played in the BDO World Trophy for the first time in 2016 and lost 6–4 to Scott Waites. He teamed up with Mariusz Paul at the 2016 PDC World Cup of Darts and they were defeated 5–1 by Belgium in the opening round. He qualified for the International Darts Open and was eliminated 6–1 by Chris Dobey in the first round.

Ratajski qualified for the 2017 BDO World Darts Championship. He earned his first two wins at the event, including a 3–0 victory over Wesley Harms, before narrowly losing to Darius Labanauskas in the last 16. At the 2017 World Cup, Ratajski and Tytus Kanik lost 5–3 in the first round to the Irish team of Mick McGowan and William O'Connor.

At the 2017 World Masters, Ratajski was unseeded and had to start from the first round. He defeated two-time reigning champion Glen Durrant in the quarter-finals, Scotland's Cameron Menzies in the semi-final, and world number one Mark McGeeney 6–1 in the final for his first televised major title. In doing so, Ratajski also guaranteed qualification for the 2018 BDO World Darts Championship, but declined his invitation in favour of an attempt to qualify for the rival 2018 PDC World Darts Championship. He qualified for the latter as the top ranked Eastern European on the PDC Pro Tour.

Ratajski competed in his first PDC premier event as a singles player at the 2017 European Championship. He lost 3–6 to Peter Wright in the first round. In the 2018 World Championship Ratajski lost 1–3 to James Wilson despite winning the first set.

In February 2018 Ratajski became the first Polish player to win a PDC event when he beat Daryl Gurney 6–4 in the final of the sixth UK Open qualifier. Due to his failure at Q-School in January, he had to play on the Challenge Tour, which he won one event in and made another final. Due to these successes, he was able to play some Players Championships towards the end of 2018.

Ratajski won his second PDC title on 20 October 2018, defeating Chris Dobey 6–2 in the final of Players Championship 21, despite not having a tour card. Ratajski also won Players Championship 22 the following day, joining an elite club of only 8 PDC players to win two Players Championship titles in a single weekend by beating Adrian Lewis 6–4. His weekend “double header” win secured his place at the 2019 PDC World Darts Championship, where he lost to Seigo Asada, the 2018 Players Championship Finals, where he beat Gerwyn Price and Adrian Lewis before losing to Danny Noppert, and the 2018 Grand Slam of Darts, where he beat Raymond van Barneveld and Adam Smith-Neale and losing to Michael Smith, playing in Group B, (that meant that he went through to the Last 16 stage) and lost to Jonny Clayton, as well as his tour card for 2019.

World Championship results

BDO
 2009: First round (lost to Edwin Max 2–3)
 2017: Second round (lost to Darius Labanauskas 3–4)

PDC
 2018: First round (lost to James Wilson 1–3)
 2019: First round (lost to Seigo Asada 2–3)
 2020: Third round (lost to Nathan Aspinall 3–4)
 2021: Quarter-finals (lost to Stephen Bunting 3–5)
 2022: Second round (lost to Steve Lennon 1–3)
 2023: Third round (lost to Dimitri Van den Bergh 1–4)

Performance timeline

PDC

PDC European Tour

Career finals

BDO major finals: 1 (1 title)

References

External links

{{#ifexpr:<21|}}

1977 births
Living people
Polish darts players
British Darts Organisation players
People from Skarżysko County
Sportspeople from Świętokrzyskie Voivodeship
Professional Darts Corporation current tour card holders
PDC ranking title winners
PDC World Cup of Darts Polish team